Havrå or Havre (sometimes Havretunet or Havråtunet) is a cluster farm along the southern shore of the island of Osterøy in Osterøy municipality, Vestland county, Norway.  Havrå is one of the last and best preserved of the common farm clusters on the western coast of Norway. Havrå was the first cultural environment to be protected under section 20 of the Norwegian Cultural Heritage Act. It was not connected to the national road network until late in the 1960s.

Havrå is situated on very steep terrain on the south side of the island of Osterøy, along the Sørfjorden.  The farm area is shaped in a typical fashion for the steep terrain along the Western Norwegian fjords. It can be clearly seen from both the railway (the Bergen Line) and the highway that goes between the cities of Bergen and Oslo.

Many of the buildings at Havrå are characteristic to the inner coastal district between Bergen and the Sognefjorden; the combination of dry masonry and juniper cladding on barn façades that are exposed to rain and wind.

Name
The name, with various spellings, dates back as far as 1303. In the oldest sources the name is written Havra (possibly representing Havrá). From the 16th century the name was often spelled (with many variations) Havre.

In 1949-1950, a film called Havretunet was made about life at Havrå. It was released in 1952. Some of the people taking part in the film worked to change the name from Havre to Havrå. This changing of name was accepted by the National Map Service, but the name change remains controversial among the local population.

Part of The Museum Centre in Hordaland 
The farm is now a part of the museum organisation The Museum Centre in Hordaland, together with Osterøy museum, The Heathland Centre at Lygra and The Western Norway Emigration Centre at Radøy, and The Textile Industry Museum, The Conservation Department, The Cultural Heritage Service in Nordhordland, and the museum administration in Salhus.

Media gallery

See also
 Strip farming in Norway
movie "Two Lives" (2012) - scenes filmed at Havra farm

References

External links
Website
Stiftinga Havråtunet  
Introduction to the documentary film about Havretunet  

 Short version of the original documentary film Havretunet
 Museumssenteret i Hordaland
 Miljøstatus i Norge: Havrå

Populated places in Vestland
Historic farms in Norway
Farms in Vestland
Osterøy